Hermann Güntert (5 November 1886 – 23 April 1948) was a German linguist who specialized in Germanic and Indo-European linguistics.

Biography
Hermann Güntert was born in Worms, Germany on 5 November 1886. His father was a Roman Catholic merchant, and his mother was a Huguenot. Güntert became fluent in Sanskrit and Hebrew as a high school student, graduating at the top of his class in 1905.

Güntert subsequently studied classical philology and German philology at the University of Heidelberg. He studied comparative linguistics under Hermann Osthoff, Indo-Iranian languages under , and religious studies under Albrecht Dieterich and Franz Boll. He received his PhD with the dissertation Zur Geschichte der griechischen Gradationsbildungen, which was about the Greek language. It was published in Indogermanische Forschungen in 1909. Güntert subsequently studied for one semester at the University of Leipzig.

In 1909, Güntert passed the staatsexamen in German, Greek and Latin, and subsequently worked as a gymnasium teacher in Heidelberg from 1909 to 1921. He completed his habilitation in 1912/1913 in Indo-European linguistics and classics with the thesis Reimwortbildung im Arischen und Altgriechischen, which examined rhymes in Indo-Iranian and Ancient Greek. He was appointed Associate Professor at the University of Heidelberg in 1918. In 1921, Güntert succeeded  as Professor of Comparative Linguistics at the University of Rostock. In 1926, he succeeded Bartholomae as Professor at the University of Heidelberg. He was elected Member of the Heidelberg Academy of Sciences and Humanities in 1931. From 1933, Güntert was also a lecturer in Germanic studies. Since 1938, he was the editor of Wörter und Sachen.

Since the spring of 1938, Güntert suffered from declining health, which forced him to reduce his activity at the University. He retired in December 1945, and died in Heidelberg on 23 April 1948.

Research
Güntert's research centered on Indo-Iranian, Ancient Greek and Germanic. He was critical of the North European hypothesis of Gustav Kossinna. Instead he supported the steppe hypothesis of Otto Schrader and Guntërt's Heidelberg colleague Ernst Wahle. In his Der Ursprung der Germanen (1934), Güntert suggested that the Germanic peoples emerged through the conquest of the Funnelbeaker culture by Indo-European invaders of the Corded Ware culture.

Güntert has been referred to as one of the most influential mythographers of his era. His Der arische Weltkönig und Heiland (1923) is widely regarded as the finest work ever published on Indo-European religion. Güntert's research on Indo-European religion has had a strong influence on the later work of Georges Dumézil, Mircea Eliade, Herman Lommel and other scholars.

Personal life
Güntert married Gisela Wachenfeld in 1923.

See also

 Jan de Vries (philologist)
 Edgar C. Polomé
 Otto Höfler
 Rudolf Much
 Georges Dumézil
 Stig Wikander
 Émile Benveniste
 Jaan Puhvel

Selected works
Zur Geschichte der griechischen Gradationsbildungen, 1909
Über Reimwortbildungen im Arischen und Altgriechischen, 1914
Indogermanische Ablautprobleme. Untersuchungen über Schwa secundum, einen zweiten indogermanischen Murmelvokal, 1916
Kalypso. Bedeutungsgeschichtliche Untersuchungen auf dem Gebiet der indogermanischen Sprachen, 1919
Von der Sprache der Götter und Geister. Bedeutungsgeschichtliche Untersuchungen zur homerischen und eddischen Göttersprache, 1921
Der arische Weltkönig und Heiland. Bedeutungsgeschichtliche Untersuchungen zur indo-iranischen Religionsgeschichte und Altertumskunde, 1923
Grundfragen der Sprachwissenschaft, 1925
Zur Frage nach der Urheimat der Indogermanen, 1930
Labyrinth. Eine sprachwissenschaftliche Untersuchung, 1932
Am Nornenquell (Gedichte), 1933
Der Ursprung der Germanen, 1934
Das faustische Wesen des germanischen Menschen, 1934
Das germanische Erbe in der deutschen Seele, 1934
 Runen, Runenbrauch und Runeninschriften der Germanen, 1934
Altgermanischer Glaube nach Wesen und Grundlage, 1937
 Geschichte der germanischen Völkerschaften, 1943

References

Sources

 Wolf H. Goegginger: Hermann Güntert als Religionsforscher. Numen 1967, pp. 150–158.
 
 Manfred Mayrhofer (ed.): Antiquitates Indogermanicae. Studien zur indogermanischen Altertumskunde und zur Sprach- und Kulturgeschichte der indogermanischen Völker. Gedenkschrift für Hermann Güntert zur 25. Wiederkehr seines Todestages am 23. April 1973, Innsbruck 1974 (pp. 523–528).

1886 births
1948 deaths
Academic staff of the University of Rostock
Etymologists
German non-fiction writers
German people of French descent
German philologists
Germanic studies scholars
Germanists
Heidelberg University alumni
Academic staff of Heidelberg University
Indo-Europeanists
Linguists of Germanic languages
Linguists of Indo-European languages
Linguists of Indo-Aryan languages
Linguists of Iranian languages
Linguists from Germany
People from Worms, Germany
Writers on Germanic paganism
20th-century linguists
20th-century non-fiction writers
20th-century philologists